Gacha games are video games that implement the gashapon mechanic. Gashapon are a type of Japanese vending machine in which people insert a coin to acquire a random toy capsule. In gacha games, players pay virtual currency (bought with real money or acquired in-game) to acquire random game characters or pieces of equipment of varying rarity and usefulness. This is a variant of the loot box mechanic where players spend currency to acquire an entire set of random game items.

Gacha games are typically mobile games made in China, Japan, South Korea, or other Asian countries, where they are very popular. They are typically free-to-play games which can be played using only the currency or characters received for free through gameplay and grinding. They are financed through the sale of virtual currency to the players who want to spend real money to progress faster or be better at competing with others. So-called "whale" players may spend significant amounts on gacha games, leading to concerns about gambling addiction.

List 
This list is limited to notable gacha games which have been released in an English-language version.

References 

Gacha